Bret Harte Union High School is a public high school serving Angels Camp, California, the only incorporated city in Calaveras County, California.  The school was established in 1905 and is named after American poet Bret Harte.

The school's official address is 321 South Main, P.O. Box 7000, Angels Camp, CA, 95221. Some directories indicate that the school is located in the unincorporated community of Altaville, California, at 364 Murphys Grade Road, Altaville, CA, 95221,

Notable alumni
 James Hecker - Lt. General, United States Air Force
 T.J. Dillashaw – MMA fighter
 Kyle Rasmussen – World Cup ski champion
 Neriah Davis - Playboy playmate, March 1997

References

External links
 http://bhhs-bhuhsd-ca.schoolloop.com/

Educational institutions established in 1905
Schools in Calaveras County, California
1905 establishments in California
Public high schools in California